Hydromys is a genus of semiaquatic rodents in the subfamily Murinae. Three species are endemic to New Guinea and nearby islands. The fourth species, the rakali, is also found on Australia. The most recently discovered member of this genus was described in 2005.

List of species 
Genus Hydromys - water rats
Rakali, Hydromys chrysogaster E. Geoffroy, 1804
Western water rat, Hydromys hussoni Musser and Piik, 1982
New Britain water rat, Hydromys neobritannicus Tate and Archbold, 1935
Ziegler's water rat, Hydromys ziegleri Helgen, 2005

Note: Hydromys habbema Tate and Archbold, 1941 and Hydromys shawmayeri (Hinton, 1943) are placed within Baiyankamys after Helgen, 2005.

References

External links 
 
 

 
Rodent genera
Taxa named by Étienne Geoffroy Saint-Hilaire